John Alexander (26 July 1802 – October 1885) was an Irish Conservative politician.

Alexander was the son of his namesake, John Alexander, and Christian née Izod. In 1848, he married Esther Brinkley, daughter of Matthew Brinkley; the couple had six children: John Alexander (born 1850); William Cranstoun Alexander (born 1851); Lorenzo Alexander (1853–1942); Charles Henry Alexander (born 1856); George Alexander (1858–1930); and Harriet Lucia Alexander.

After holding the office of High Sheriff of Carlow in 1824, Alexander was elected as the Conservative Member of Parliament (MP) for Carlow Borough at a by-election in 1853, defeating John Sadleir who had been required to stand in a by-election after he was appointed a Lord Commissioner of the Treasury. He held the seat until his defeat at the 1859 general election.

References

External links
 

1802 births
1885 deaths
High Sheriffs of Carlow
Irish Conservative Party MPs
Members of the Parliament of the United Kingdom for County Carlow constituencies (1801–1922)
UK MPs 1852–1857